Jaka Železnikar (born 1971) is a Slovenian artist known for his computational poetry and internet art. The base of his work is a nonlinear language-based expression combined with visual art. Since 1997 he has been part of the net art community, and since 2004 he has created several expressive add-ons for the Firefox browser.

Life
Železnikar was born in 1971 in Ljubljana, Slovenia.

Work

His works are mostly bilingual (Slovene and English).

Železnikar has created about 25 net art works. Notable works include Interactivalia, a 1997 interactive poetry work in Solvenian and English and "Ascii Kosovel",  mix of nonlinear poetic interactive or computational narratives based on a work by Srečko Kosovel, Slovenian avantgard poet (1904—1926).

His 2002 work "Poems for Echelon was a computer-based interactive work that invited users to send emails to the program itself. In doing so , the users participated in the production of poems that were designed to confuse  ECHELON, a US Intelligence gathering system.
  
Since 2004 he has created several expressive add-ons for the Firefox web browser, including the on-line visual poem "Letters · 字母 2.0" and "Disorganizer", made in 2007.

Gallery

References

External links
 Official site

1971 births
Living people
Slovenian poets
Slovenian male poets
Digital artists
Net.artists